The 1882 Delaware gubernatorial election was held on November 7, 1882. Incumbent Democratic Governor John W. Hall was unable to seek re-election. Former State Senator Charles C. Stockley ran as the Democratic nominee to succeed Hall and faced Republican nominee Albert Curry. The Republican Party campaigned on organizing a new constitutional convention and launched a vigorous statewide effort. However, Stockley defeated Curry by a decisive margin and a unanimously Democratic state legislature was elected alongside him, securing the Party's dominance in the state for another four years.

General election

Results

References

Bibliography
 
 
 
 Delaware Senate Journal, 79th General Assembly, 1st Reg. Sess. (1883).

1882
Delaware
Gubernatorial